From the Witchwood is the third album by the English band Strawbs. It was recorded at Air Studios in London during February and March 1971 and reached number 39 in the UK Albums Chart on 17 July 1971.

The album is the third and final album to include Rick Wakeman, including his appearance as a  session musician on the 1970 album Dragonfly. The sleeve illustration was "The Vision of St. Jerome", a tapestry from the Spanish royal collection.

Track listing

Personnel
Strawbs
Dave Cousins – lead vocals, backing vocals, acoustic guitar, electric guitar, dulcimer, banjo, recorder
Tony Hooper – lead vocals, backing vocals, acoustic guitar, autoharp, tambourine
Rick Wakeman – piano, organ, celeste, mellotron, Moog synthesizer, clavinet, harpsichord
John Ford – lead vocals, backing vocals, bass guitar
Richard Hudson – lead vocals, backing vocals, drums, sitar
with:
The Choir and Congregation of Air Strawb - choir on "A Glimpse of Heaven"

Recording
Tony Visconti – producer
Bill Price – engineer
Alan Harris – engineer
John Punter – engineer
Chris Michie – engineer

Release history

References

External links
From the Witchwood on Strawbsweb

Strawbs albums
1971 albums
Albums produced by Tony Visconti
A&M Records albums
Albums recorded at AIR Studios